Emory William Hunt (February 2, 1862 – May 20, 1938) was president of Bucknell University from 1919 to 1931.

In February 1928, Hunt Hall, which was named for Hunt, was opened at Bucknell.

References

External links
Education for the ministry: an address By Emory William Hunt
Memorials of Bucknell University: the administration of Emory William Hunt, 1919–1931, Editor Lewis E. Theiss

1862 births
1938 deaths
People from Clarence, New York
Presidents of Bucknell University